The 2023 season will be Paysandu's 110th season in the club's history. Paysandu will be compete in the Campeonato Paraense, Copa Verde, Série C and Copa do Brasil.

Current squad

Statistics

Overall
{|class="wikitable"
|-
|Games played || 9 (7 Campeonato Paraense, 2 Copa Verde, 0 Copa do Brasil, 0 Campeonato Brasileiro)
|-
|Games won || 6 (5 Campeonato Paraense, 1 Copa Verde, 0 Copa do Brasil, 0 Campeonato Brasileiro)
|-
|Games drawn || 2 (1 Campeonato Paraense, 1 Copa Verde, 0 Copa do Brasil, 0 Campeonato Brasileiro)
|-
|Games lost || 1 (1 Campeonato Paraense, 0 Copa Verde, 0 Copa do Brasil, 0 Campeonato Brasileiro)
|-
|Goals scored || 17
|-
|Goals conceded || 8
|-
|Goal difference || +9
|-
|Best results  || 3–0 (H) v Real Ariquemes - Copa Verde - 2023.02.22
|-
|Worst result || 1–2 (A) v Caeté - Campeonato Paraense - 2023.03.04
|-
|Top scorer || Mário Sérgio (8)
|-

Goalscorers

Managers performance

Campeonato Paraense

First Stage

Copa Verde

Round of 16

Quarter-finals

Copa do Brasil

Série C

First stage

Results summary

Matches

References

External links

Paysandu Sport Club seasons
Paysandu